Kaaoksen Kuningas is the third album from the Finnish hard rock band Kilpi.

Track listing
 "Laske Kuolleet Ja Rukoile" – 4:44
 "Kahdeksas Ihme" – 4:45
 "Ihminen" – 4:17
 "Yhtä ihoa" – 4:46
 "Velka" – 4:08
 "Toinen Minä" – 3:38
 "Lihaa Ja Verta" – 3:57
 "Katharsis" – 4:22
 "Kuolleet Tunteet" – 4:57
 "Kaaoksen Kuningas" – 7:42

2006 albums
Kilpi albums